Wanaque is a borough in Passaic County, in the U.S. state of New Jersey. As of the 2020 United States census, the borough's population was 11,317, an increase of 201 (+1.8%) from the 2010 census count of 11,116, which in turn reflected an increase of 850 (+8.3%) from the 10,266 counted in the 2000 census.

History
Wanaque was incorporated as an independent borough on February 23, 1918, when Pompton Township was split up into three boroughs, along with Bloomingdale and Ringwood, and affirmed by a referendum held on March 22, 1918. The borough's name Wanaque (original pronunciation 'Wa Na Kee') is thought to have been derived from a Lenni Lenape Native American word meaning "land of sassafras".

Geography
According to the United States Census Bureau, the borough had a total area of 9.33 square miles (24.15 km2), including 8.07 square miles (20.89 km2) of land and 1.26 square miles (3.26 km2) of water (13.50%).

Unincorporated communities, localities and place names located partially or completely within the borough include Haskell, Lake Inez, Lake Washington, Meadow Brook Lake, Midvale, Ramapo Lake, Rotten Pond, Stephens Lake and Upper Midvale.

Both Wanaque (formerly Midvale) and Haskell have their own ZIP Codes and are served by separate post offices.

The borough borders the municipalities of Bloomingdale, Pompton Lakes and Ringwood in Passaic County; and Oakland in Bergen County.

Demographics

2010 census

The Census Bureau's 2006–2010 American Community Survey showed that (in 2010 inflation-adjusted dollars) median household income was $89,459 (with a margin of error of +/− $5,457) and the median family income was $98,081 (+/− $7,333). Males had a median income of $62,454 (+/− $4,289) versus $49,421 (+/− $6,017) for females. The per capita income for the borough was $37,579 (+/− $3,293). About 1.0% of families and 2.6% of the population were below the poverty line, including 3.3% of those under age 18 and 0.8% of those age 65 or over.

Same-sex couples headed 20 households in 2010, a decline from the 22 counted in 2000.

2000 census
As of the 2000 United States census there were 10,266 people, 3,444 households, and 2,689 families residing in the borough. The population density was 1,286.8 people per square mile (496.7/km2). There were 3,500 housing units at an average density of 438.7 per square mile (169.3/km2). The racial makeup of the borough was 90.67% White, 1.51% African American, 0.34% Native American, 3.62% Asian, 0.03% Pacific Islander, 2.06% from other races, and 1.77% from two or more races. Hispanic or Latino of any race were 5.40% of the population.

There were 3,444 households, out of which 37.9% had children under the age of 18 living with them, 63.2% were married couples living together, 10.9% had a female householder with no husband present, and 21.9% were non-families. 16.7% of all households were made up of individuals, and 5.8% had someone living alone who was 65 years of age or older. The average household size was 2.86 and the average family size was 3.23.

In the borough the population was spread out, with 24.4% under the age of 18, 6.9% from 18 to 24, 31.7% from 25 to 44, 25.0% from 45 to 64, and 12.0% who were 65 years of age or older. The median age was 38 years. For every 100 females, there were 93.3 males. For every 100 females age 18 and over, there were 91.4 males.

The median income for a household in the borough was $66,113, and the median income for a family was $71,127. Males had a median income of $43,675 versus $33,380 for females. The per capita income for the borough was $25,403. About 2.6% of families and 3.3% of the population were below the poverty line, including 3.5% of those under age 18 and 4.1% of those age 65 or over.

Law and government

Local government
Wanaque is governed under the Borough form of New Jersey municipal government, which is used in 218 municipalities (of the 564) statewide, making it the most common form of government in New Jersey. The governing body is comprised of the Mayor and the Borough Council, with all positions elected at-large on a partisan basis as part of the November general election. The Mayor is elected directly by the voters to a four-year term of office. The Borough Council is comprised of six members elected to serve three-year terms on a staggered basis, with two seats coming up for election each year in a three-year cycle. The Borough form of government used by Wanaque is a "weak mayor / strong council" government in which council members act as the legislative body with the mayor presiding at meetings and voting only in the event of a tie. The mayor can veto ordinances subject to an override by a two-thirds majority vote of the council. The mayor makes committee and liaison assignments for council members, and most appointments are made by the mayor with the advice and consent of the council.

, the Mayor of Wanaque Borough is Republican Daniel Mahler, whose term of office ends December 31, 2026. Members of the Borough Council are Thomas Balunis (R, 2024), Dominick Cortellessa (R, 2025), Edward Leonard (R, 2025), Donald Pasquariello (R, 2023), Bridget A. Pasznik (R, 2024), and Robert Pettet (R, 2023).

Federal, state, and county representation
Wanaque is located in the 5th Congressional District and is part of New Jersey's 39th state legislative district. 

Prior to the 2011 reapportionment following the 2010 Census, Wanaque had been in the 40th state legislative district.

 

Passaic County is governed by Board of County Commissioners, comprised of seven members who are elected at-large to staggered three-year terms office on a partisan basis, with two or three seats coming up for election each year as part of the November general election in a three-year cycle. At a reorganization meeting held in January, the board selects a Director and Deputy Director from among its members to serve for a one-year term. 
, Passaic County's Commissioners are 
Director Bruce James (D, Clifton, term as commissioner ends December 31, 2023; term as director ends 2022),
Deputy Director Cassandra "Sandi" Lazzara (D, Little Falls, term as commissioner ends 2024; term as deputy director ends 2022),
John W. Bartlett (D, Wayne, 2024),
Theodore O. "T.J." Best Jr. (D, Paterson, 2023),
Terry Duffy (D, West Milford, 2022),
Nicolino Gallo (R, Totowa, 2024) and 
Pasquale "Pat" Lepore (D, Woodland Park, 2022).
Constitutional officers, elected on a countywide basis are
County Clerk Danielle Ireland-Imhof (D, Hawthorne, 2023),
Sheriff Richard H. Berdnik (D, Clifton, 2022) and 
Surrogate Zoila S. Cassanova (D, Wayne, 2026).

Politics
As of March 2011, there were a total of 7,085 registered voters in Wanaque, of which 1,646 (23.2% vs. 31.0% countywide) were registered as Democrats, 2,191 (30.9% vs. 18.7%) were registered as Republicans and 3,243 (45.8% vs. 50.3%) were registered as Unaffiliated. There were 5 voters registered as Libertarians or Greens. Among the borough's 2010 Census population, 63.7% (vs. 53.2% in Passaic County) were registered to vote, including 80.3% of those ages 18 and over (vs. 70.8% countywide).

In the 2012 presidential election, Republican Mitt Romney received 51.7% of the vote (2,633 cast), ahead of Democrat Barack Obama with 47.2% (2,400 votes), and other candidates with 1.1% (55 votes), among the 5,132 ballots cast by the borough's 7,472 registered voters (44 ballots were spoiled), for a turnout of 68.7%. In the 2008 presidential election, Republican John McCain received 2,798 votes (52.1% vs. 37.7% countywide), ahead of Democrat Barack Obama with 2,428 votes (45.2% vs. 58.8%) and other candidates with 46 votes (0.9% vs. 0.8%), among the 5,374 ballots cast by the borough's 7,117 registered voters, for a turnout of 75.5% (vs. 70.4% in Passaic County). In the 2004 presidential election, Republican George W. Bush received 2,452 votes (55.1% vs. 42.7% countywide), ahead of Democrat John Kerry with 1,876 votes (42.1% vs. 53.9%) and other candidates with 39 votes (0.9% vs. 0.7%), among the 4,451 ballots cast by the borough's 6,132 registered voters, for a turnout of 72.6% (vs. 69.3% in the whole county).

In the 2013 gubernatorial election, Republican Chris Christie received 66.1% of the vote (2,107 cast), ahead of Democrat Barbara Buono with 32.7% (1,042 votes), and other candidates with 1.2% (38 votes), among the 3,235 ballots cast by the borough's 7,614 registered voters (48 ballots were spoiled), for a turnout of 42.5%. In the 2009 gubernatorial election, Republican Chris Christie received 1,802 votes (53.1% vs. 43.2% countywide), ahead of Democrat Jon Corzine with 1,338 votes (39.4% vs. 50.8%), Independent Chris Daggett with 194 votes (5.7% vs. 3.8%) and other candidates with 34 votes (1.0% vs. 0.9%), among the 3,396 ballots cast by the borough's 6,887 registered voters, yielding a 49.3% turnout (vs. 42.7% in the county).

Education
The Wanaque Borough Schools serves students in public school for pre-kindergarten through eighth grade. As of the 2018–19 school year, the district, comprised of two schools, had an enrollment of 901 students and 92.1 classroom teachers (on an FTE basis), for a student–teacher ratio of 9.8:1. Schools in the district (with 2018–19 enrollment data from the National Center for Education Statistics) are 
Haskell Elementary School 394 students in grades Pre-K–8 and 
Wanaque Elementary School 497 students in grades Pre-K–8.

Students in public school for ninth through twelfth grades attend Lakeland Regional High School, which serves students from the Boroughs of Ringwood and Wanaque. The high school is located in Wanaque and is part of the Lakeland Regional High School District. As of the 2018–2019 school year, the high school had an enrollment of 930 students and 86.5 classroom teachers (on an FTE basis), for a student–teacher ratio of 10.8:1.

Wanaque is the site of Passaic County Community College's Wanaque Academic Center.

Transportation

Roads and highways

Several major roadways traverse through the borough.

Public transportation
NJ Transit provides bus service to and from the Port Authority Bus Terminal in Midtown Manhattan on the 197 route.

Notable people

People who were born in, residents of, or otherwise closely associated with Wanaque include:

 Kevin Carolan (born 1968), actor and comedian
 Bobby Czyz (born 1962), boxer who is both a former world light heavyweight and cruiserweight champion
 John McCutcheon (1879–1942), politician who served as the New Jersey State Comptroller and the Passaic County Clerk
 Bill Palatucci, (born 1958), attorney who served on the Republican National Committee and the New Jersey Apportionment Commission, and headed selection of staff for the presidential transition of Donald Trump
 Ernestine Petras (born 1924), infielder who played in the All-American Girls Professional Baseball League
 John Pfahl (1939–2020), photographer
 Chris Port (born 1967), former NFL offensive lineman who played for five seasons for the New Orleans Saints

Points of interest

Elks Camp Moore is an Elks accredited summer overnight camp for children with special needs. The camp was founded in 1971 and includes many activities for the children such as a swimming pool, three playgrounds, a small playing field, a recreation hall, and rooms that house other fun activities. The campers stay for one week from Sunday until Saturday. Each week, 75 campers attend the camp and are assigned to their own counselor. The camp is wheelchair accessible since handicapped children also attend the camp. People consider Camp Moore, the "Miracle on the Mountain". The camp is located high on top of a mountain overlooking Route 287 in Haskell. Admission is free for the campers, and the camp is funded in part by local New Jersey Elks lodges.

References

External links

 Wanaque Borough official website
 Wanaque Borough Schools
 
 School Data for the Wanaque Borough Schools, National Center for Education Statistics
 Lakeland Regional High School
 Wanaque Chamber of Commerce website
 Wanaque Borough Republicans Club
 Wanaque Borough Democratic Club
 Wanaque Haskell Education Foundation
 

 
1918 establishments in New Jersey
Borough form of New Jersey government
Boroughs in Passaic County, New Jersey
Populated places established in 1918